Ant War is computer game for Windows published by American studio Anarchy Enterprises in 2003.

In Ant War, the player must make strategic decisions to grow a colony of  ants in order to conquer the world, by battling against enemies such as crickets or spiders. The goal is to accumulate 1 billion ants.

History
The original Ant War was a web game published in 2000, and its popularity encouraged Anarchy Enterprises to develop a full PC version. Ant War was influenced by the quick pick-up time of casual strategy game, Lemonade Tycoon. A demo version of the game was made available to play in web browsers.

Ant War has since been released as a free to play game with in app purchases on IOS and Android devices. It was released on the Steam Store as Ant War: Domination on October 2, 2015.

Game Play
At the outset of each game the player is required to pick one of five ant types which affects how their colony performs. Leaf cutter ants: who find more food bonuses. Harvester Ants: who find more food items each day. Weaver Ants: who make new ants faster and find gems easier, they also do not like to fight. Carpenter ants who make the nest grow larger. Fire ants: who are good at fighting and find more enemies to fight.

Game play consists of building an ant colony by assigning percentages of your ants each day to one of four different roles: Farmers/Scouts: who farm and forage for food; Nurses: who breed new ants for your colony; Workers: who expand your ant colony; and Soldiers: who are dedicated fighters for your colony. The ant colony has three main resources that are used food, nest size, and ants. Your ants need food to survive, the size of the nest dictates how many ants can live in the colony as well as how much food can be stored, and the number of ants in the colony shows your overall success. As your colony grows large you can move it to increasingly difficult zones.

Your colony can also fight different enemies throughout the game in turn based combat. The colonies fighting power is displayed by an attack and defense value based on the number of ants in the colony as well as the percentage of ants assigned to be soldiers. The health of the colony is the total number of ants in the colony. The enemies faced also have their own health total (the number of ants if you are fighting a rival ant colony) and attack and  defense values. Combat has three options: Retreat, Auto Battle, and Attack. Retreating runs from the enemies with the chance to lose ants in the retreat, Auto Battle decides whether to attack or retreat, and Attack takes a turn in the combat. Defeating enemies will yield food for the colony.

External links
Official website

References

2003 video games
Anarchy Enterprises games
Android (operating system) games
IOS games
Strategy video games
Video games about ants
Video games developed in the United States
Windows games